Nanna or Nana was a popular Telugu television show. The show aired on Gemini TV from 5 April 2004 as a bi-weekly serial on Monday and Tuesday at 9pm and later shifting to Saturday and Sunday 7pm, ending on 23 January 2005 with 86 episodes. The serial was based on a novel by Malladi Venkata Krishna Murthy which was earlier made into a feature film. The serial won the Best T.V. Serial - 2004 Nandi Award.

Production
The show was produced by Venkat Dega and Ganga Raju Gunnam, with the company Just Yellow Media, and directed by Muralikrishna Mudidhani. The script was written by Aasam Srinivas, based on a novel by Malladi Venkata Krishna Murthy. The show's music was composed by Kalyani Mallik. This show again replay in Maa tv at 11:30 A.M.

Cast 
Nutan Prasad as a Kakarla Dasaratha Ramayya 
Master Vamsi Mohan as Siddhart “Siddu”
Naveen as Kakarla Sambasivarao “Sambudu”
Anitha Chowdary as Julie/Sarada
Preeti Amin/Swathi as Kavitha (Sambasiva's wife)
Raghunatha Reddy as Kakarla Dasaratharamayya’s best friend.
Sivannarayana Naripeddi as Panchaksharam (Sambasivarao's best friend)
Ragini as Suguna 
Chitralekha as Nandini
 Bharani Shankar as Bharani 
 Vasu Inturi as S.I. Anki Reddy

Awards

References

Telugu-language television shows
Gemini TV original programming